This is a list of Cameroonian writers.

 Boé A-Amang (1938– ), playwright and theatre director
 Severin Cecile Abega (1955–2008), French-language fiction writer and anthropologist, author of Les Bimanes, Le Bourreau and Entre Terre et Ciel
 Imbolo Mbue (1981– ) novelist
 Marie-Therese Assiga Ahanda, chemist and novelist
 Paul-Charles Atangana (1930– ), French-language poet
 Philomène Bassek (1957– ), French-language novelist, author of La Tache de Sang
 Francis Bebey (1929–2001), author of Les Trois Petits Cireurs, Agatha Moudio'son, The Ashanti Doll, Enfant Pluie and Ministre et le Griot 
 Jacques Bengono (1938– ), poet and short story writer
 Bate Besong (1954–2007), poet
 Mongo Beti, pseudonym of Alexandre Biyidi Awala (1932–2001), novelist writing in French  
 Calixthe Beyala (1961– ), novelist writing in French 
 Jacques Bonjawo (1960– ), software engineer and columnist
 Bole Butake (1947–2016), playwright
 Fernando d'Almeida (1955– ), journalist and poet
 Paul Dakeyo (1948– ), poet
 Nsah Mala (1988– ), poet, fiction writer, children's author
 Mbella Sonne Dipoko (1936–2009), English-language novelist, poet and painter 
 Lydie Dooh Bunya (born 1933), journalist and writer.
 Ntone Edjabe (1970– ), journalist
 Gaston-Paul Effa (1965– ), novelist
 Jean Marc Ela (1936–2008), African liberation theologian, author of African Cry and My Faith as an African
 Frieda Ekotto, professor and novelist; Chuchote pas trop/Don't Whisper too Much
 Samuel-Martin Eno Belinga (1935–2004), poet, geologist and civil servant 
 Elolongué Epanya Yondo (1930–1998), poet in French and Duala 
 Valère Epée (1938– ), musician, poet and historian
Denise Epoté (1954– ), journalist and head of African reporting for TV5 Monde
 Professor Ndumbe Eyoh (1949–2006), playwright
 Alexis Maxime Feyou de Happy, French-language playwright, author of Conscience Ouverte (1974), Dithy (2002), Fairy Tales from Propagamar (2006), Victus Libri/Classic African Art (2008), Les Mezzotiniales (2009), Bodanou le Petit Oiseau Rouge (2010), and La Septieme Colonne/L'Ombre de Meridor (2010)
 Jean Ikelle-Matiba (1936–1984)
 Bernard Fonlon (1924–1986), politician and writer
 Patrice Kayo (1942– ), poet, short story writer and oral storyteller
 Yodi Karone (1954– ), novelist 
 Jacques Kuoh Moukouri (1909–2002), civil servant and autobiographical writer
 Thérèse Kuoh-Moukouri (1938– ), novelist
 Werewere Liking (1950– ), novelist also associated with Côte d'Ivoire
 'Sankie Maimo (1930–2013), playwright
 Benjamin Matip (1932–2017), novelist and playwright
 Claude-Joseph M'Bafou-Zetebeg (1948– ), French-language poet
 Achille Mbembe (1957– ), political philosopher
 William Eteki'a Mbumua (1933–2016)
 Rémy Sylvestre Medou Mvomo (1938– ), novelist and playwright 
 Dualla Misipo (1901–?), autobiographical writer
 Pabé Mongo (1948– ), playwright and novelist
 Evelyne Mpoudi Ngolé (1953– ), French-language novelist, author of Sous La Cendre Le Feu and Petit Jo, Enfant Des Rues
 Engelbert Mveng (1930–1995), Jesuit priest and French-language poet, author of Balafon 
 Bernard Nanga (1934–1985), French-language novelist, author of Les Chauve-Souris
 David Ndachi Tagne (1958– ), novelist and journalist
 Patrice Ndedi-Penda (1945– ), playwright
 Bill F. Ndi (1964– ), English-language poet and playwright, author of K'cracy, Trees in the Storm and Other Poems, Mishaps and Other Poems, Toils and Travails, and Gods in the Ivory Towers 
 Timothee Ndzaagap (1949– ), poet, playwright and story writer
 Patrice Nganang (1970– ), novelist
 Charles Ngandé, French-language poet
 Job Nganthojeff (1936– ), poet
 Jeanne Ngo Mai (1933–2008), French-language poet
 John Emmanuel Akwo Ngoh (c.1940–2008), poet and novelist
 Joel Gustave Nana Ngongang (1982–2015), activist and writer
 Simon Njami (1962– ), novelist
 Martin Njoya (1944– ), poet
 John Nkemngong Nkengasong (1959– ), poet, playwright, novelist and critic
 Jean-Jacques Nkollo (1962– ), novelist
 Etienne B. Noumé, pen name of Etienne NKepndep (1944–1970), French-language poet
 Jean-Paul-Nyunaï (1932– ), French-language poet 
 Anne Mireille Nzouankeu, journalist
 Jacques Muriel Nzouankeu (1938– ), short story writer and playwright
 Joseph Owono (1921–1981), novelist and diplomat
 Ferdinand Oyono (1929–2010 ), novelist  
 Guillaume Oyono-Mbia (1939–2021), playwright writing in English and French, author of Trois Pretendants un mari  
 René Philombé, pseudonym of Philippe-Louis Ombede (1930–2001), novelist and editor 
 Careen Pilo (fl. 2010s), novelist and diplomat
 Louis-Marie Pouka-M'Bague (1910– ), journalist and poet
 Simon Rifoé (1943– ), teacher and autobiographical writer
 Francois Sengat-Kuo (1931–1997), French-language poet, author of Fleurs de Laterite, Heures rouges, and Collier de Cauris 
 Veye Tatah (c. 1971– ), journalist living in Germany
 Marcien Towa
 Delphine Zanga Tsogo (1935–2020), feminist and writer
 Shey Ductu (1991– ), short story and essay writer

References

Cameroonian
Writers